Helen Glaves is the Senior Data Scientist at the British Geological Survey. She serves as Editor for the American Geophysical Union Earth and Space Science journal and was awarded the European Geosciences Union Ian McHarg medal. Glaves will serve as the President of the European Geosciences Union from 2021 to 2023.

Early life and education 
Glaves earned bachelor's degrees in geology and information technology. Her early research focussed on database design.

Research and career 
Glaves has contributed to novel ways to store and share marine research data. She is the programme manager of the Research Data Alliance, which she has been involved with since its inception. Glaves co-ordinates the Ocean Data Interoperability Platform (ODIP), which looks to share ocean data across scientific domains and international borders. She led the expansion of ODIP (ODIP-II) that supported transferring data in different formats between research centres. ODIP-II makes use of the Natural Environment Research Council (NERC) vocabulary server to transfer between different data formats. The vocabulary server was developed by the British Oceanographic Data Centre and National Oceanography Centre.

In 2016 Glaves was awarded the  European Geosciences Union (EGU) Ian McHarg medal. She serves as the President of the EGU Earth and Space Science Informatics section. She was elected the President of the European Geosciences Union from 2021 to 2023. She is an Editor of the American Geophysical Union journal Earth and Space Science.

References 

Living people
Year of birth missing (living people)
Data scientists
British women geologists
Geology award winners
Academic journal editors